Paul Sinnott Doyle (October 2, 1939 – May 6, 2020) was an American professional baseball player and left-handed relief pitcher who appeared in 87 games over three seasons (1969–1970; 1972) for the Atlanta Braves, San Diego Padres and California Angels of Major League Baseball (MLB).

He graduated from Huron High School in 1958. His professional baseball career began in 1959 in the Detroit Tigers' farm system. It would take him ten years and five MLB organizations before he reached the majors.

As a 29-year-old rookie, Doyle was an effective member of the 1969 Braves' bullpen, working in 36 games and 39 innings pitched, winning each of his two decisions, posting four saves, compiling a strong 2.08 earned run average, and helping his team win the National League West Division championship. Doyle appeared in Game 2 of the 1969 NLCS against the New York Mets; in one inning, he allowed two unearned runs on two hits. The Mets took the contest, 11–6, and proceeded to sweep the best-of-three series en route to their first world championship.

The Braves sold Doyle's contract to the Angels that November, and he worked in 49 games in 1970, his only full campaign in MLB. However, after posting a 3–1 record, a 5.14 earned run average, and five saves through August 16, he was sold again, this time to the Padres. Pitching for last-place San Diego over the final weeks of the 1970 season, Doyle earned two saves but dropped both of his decisions. He then returned to the Angels' organization to spend 1971 at Triple-A Salt Lake City. Suffering from a sore arm, he was able to make only two appearances for the 1972 Angels before retiring from the game.

In his 87-game MLB career, Doyle allowed 85 hits and 46 bases on balls in 90 innings pitched, with 65 strikeouts. In addition to his 5–3 career won–lost record, he was credited with 11 saves.

Doyle died on May 6, 2020.

References

External links

1939 births
2020 deaths
Amarillo Sonics players
Atlanta Braves players
Baseball players from Philadelphia
California Angels players
Dallas–Fort Worth Spurs players
El Paso Sun Kings players
Erie Sailors players
Major League Baseball pitchers
Modesto Reds players
People from Erie County, Ohio
Richmond Braves players
Salt Lake City Angels players
San Diego Padres players
Springfield Giants players